The Brabanter is a Dutch breed of crested chicken originating in the historic region of Brabant which straddles Belgium and the Netherlands. It is an ancient breed and is shown in 17th-century paintings. A bantam Brabanter was created in around 1934.

History

The Brabanter has been bred in the Netherlands, and particularly in Brabant, for a long time. The oldest known image of one is in a painting of 1676 by the Dutch artist Melchior d'Hondecoeter. They soon spread from their area of origin. Black and Cuckoo Brabanters were shown at the first German poultry exhibition, at Görlitz in Saxony, in 1854. The Brabanter became nearly extinct in the early 20th century, but was recovered by cross-breeding with other crested and bearded birds.

Characteristics

The Brabanter is among the lightest of chicken breeds; cocks weigh  and hens . It has a narrow crest and a three-part beard. The crest is unlike that of most other crested breeds such as the Polish: it projects upwards and slightly forwards like that of the very similar Swiss Appenzeller Spitzhauben. The Brabanter has a V-shaped comb. The earlobes are small and white, and the wattles are often absent; both earlobes and wattles are hidden by the beard.

Seven colour varieties are recognised in the Netherlands: black, chamois, cuckoo, gold spangled, laced blue, silver spangled and white; in Germany there are thirteen.

A bantam Brabanter was created in around 1934 by cross-breeding the standard-sized Brabanter with bearded bantams of the Polish breed.

Use

Hens lay a moderate number of white eggs, do not frequently go broody, and are fairly good winter layers. The breed has a fair build, and thus is a decent table-bird. The Brabanter is a calm breed that is intelligent. It can stand confinement. The Brabanter is suitable for cold areas because its smaller comb and wattles are less susceptible to frostbite.

See also
 List of chicken breeds

References

Chicken breeds originating in Belgium
Chicken breeds
Chicken breeds originating in the Netherlands